Lifetime is an Asian television channel owned by A+E Networks Asia.

Unlike its U.S. & Korea counterpart, Lifetime airs mostly entertainment and lifestyle programs aimed for female audiences.
On December 14, 2018, Lifetime ceased on Astro until it was leaked on August 31, 2021 that Lifetime will be relaunch on Astro and September 15, 2021, Astro announced that Lifetime will relaunch on Astro on September 15, 2021, replacing FOX Life that will be ceased on October 1, 2021.

Programming

Current
The Ellen DeGeneres Show
Dance Moms
Income Property
Mom's Time Out
My Haunted House
MasterChef Australia
MasterChef Asia
Right This Minute
The Amazing Race Australia
The Rap Game
The Best Moment to Quit Your Job
Tiny House Nation 
Zombie House Flipping

Upcoming
Married at the First Sight: Australia
Backstreet Rookie

Previous
F Word Out Loud with Anne Curtis
Smile
Hoarders: Family Secrets
Hoarders (Currently re-airing Season 7 every weekdays at 8am SIN / 7am JKT TH)
The Amazing Race Canada
UnREAL
Married at the First Sight
Don’t Trust Andrew Mayne
Mixology
Orphan Black
Resurrection
King
Wife Swap
MasterChef Canada
MasterChef New Zealand
Wahlburgers
Zoo

See also
Lifetime U.S.A.

References

External links

A&E Networks
Television channels and stations established in 2013
English-language television stations
Mass media in Southeast Asia